The besra  (Accipiter virgatus), also called the besra sparrowhawk, is a bird of prey in the family Accipitridae.

The besra is a widespread resident breeder in dense forests throughout southern Asia, ranging from the Indian subcontinent eastwards across Southeast Asia and into East Asia. It nests in trees, building a new nest each year. It lays 2 to 5 eggs.

This bird is a medium-sized raptor (29 to 36 cm) with short broad wings and a long tail, both adaptations to fast maneuvering through dense vegetation. The normal flight of this species is a characteristic "flap–flap–glide".

This species is like a darker version of the widespread shikra with darker upperparts, strongly barred underwing, broader gular stripe and thin long legs and toes. The adult male besra has dark blue-grey upperparts, and is white, barred reddish brown below. The larger female is browner above than the male. The juvenile is dark brown above and white, barred with brown below. In all plumages have 3-4 equally sized dark bands on uppertail.

In winter, the besra will emerge into more open woodland including savannah and cultivation. Its hunting technique is similar to other small hawks such as the sparrowhawk and the sharp-shinned hawk, relying on surprise as it flies from a hidden perch or flicks over a bush to catch its prey unaware.

The prey is lizards, dragonflies, and small birds and mammals.

Taxonomy
The besra includes the following recognized subspecies:
 A. v. affinis - Hodgson, 1836
 A. v. fuscipectus - Mees, 1970
 A. v. besra - Jerdon, 1839
 A. v. vanbemmeli - Voous, 1950
 A. v. rufotibialis - Sharpe, 1887
 A. v. virgatus (Temminck, 1822)
 A. v. quinquefasciatus - Mees, 1984
 A. v. abdulalii - Mees, 1981
 A. v. confusus - Hartert, 1910
 A. v. quagga - Parkes, 1973

References

 Birds of India by Grimmett, Inskipp and Inskipp, 

Accipiter
True hawks
Birds of prey of Asia
Birds of India
Birds of China
Birds of Indonesia
Birds of the Philippines
Birds described in 1822